Walker House, and variations including Walker Homestead and Walker Barn, may refer to:

 Walker House (Daphne, Alabama), listed on the National Register of Historic Places (NRHP) in Baldwin County, Alabama
Joseph M. Walker House, Mobile, Alabama, listed on the NRHP in Mobile County
Walker-Klinner Farm, Maplesville, Alabama, listed on the NRHP in Chilton County
Walker-Broderick House, Ketchikan, Alaska, listed on the NRHP in Ketchikan Gateway Borough
O. E. Walker House, Kingman, Arizona, listed on the NRHP in Mojave County, Arizona
Harry Walker House, Tempe, Arizona, listed on the NRHP in Maricopa County, Arizona
Walker House (Dermott, Arkansas), formerly listed on the National Register of Historic Places in Chicot County
 Walker House (Fayetteville, Arkansas), listed on the NRHP in Washington County
Walker Homestead Historic District, Garner, Arkansas, listed on the NRHP in White County
Thomas Walker House, Hardy, Arkansas, listed on the NRHP in Sharp County
 Evelyn Gill Walker House, in Paris, Arkansas, listed on the NRHP in Logan County
Otha Walker Homestead, West Point, Arkansas, listed on the NRHP in White County
Walker House, Oakland, California, opened by Yvette Flunder for services to people affected by HIV/AIDS 
Walker Ranch Historic District, Boulder, Colorado, listed on the NRHP in Boulder County
Armstrong-Walker House, Middletown, Delaware, listed on the NRHP in New Castle County
R. Walker Barn, Newark, Delaware, listed on the NRHP in New Castle County
Galloway-Walker House, Newport, Delaware, listed on the NRHP in New Castle County
Walker's Mill and Walker's Bank, Wilmington, Delaware, listed on the NRHP
Horace Walker House, St. Augustine, Florida, listed on the NRHP in St. Johns County
Harris-Pearson-Walker House, Augusta, Georgia, listed on the NRHP in Richmond County 
Walker-Peters-Langdon House, Columbus, Georgia, listed on the NRHP in Muscogee County
Almand-O'Kelley-Walker House, Conyers, Georgia, listed on the NRHP in Rockdale County
H. Alexander Walker Residence, Honolulu, Hawaii, listed on the NRHP on Oahu
Madame C. J. Walker Building, Indianapolis, Indiana, listed on the NRHP in Marion County, Indiana
James Walker House, Anchorage, Kentucky, listed on the NRHP in Anchorage
E. W. Walker House, Hopkinsville, Kentucky, listed on the NRHP in Christian County
Walker House (Lancaster, Kentucky), listed on the NRHP in Garrard County
Hankla-Walker House, Perryville, Kentucky, listed on the NRHP in Boyle County
William Walker House, Richmond, Kentucky, listed on the NRHP in Madison County
Walker House (Richmond, Kentucky), listed on the National Register of Historic Places in Madison County
 Morgan Walker House, in Alexandria, Louisiana, listed on the NRHP in Rapides Parish
Walker House (New Orleans, Louisiana), listed on the National Register of Historic Places in Orleans Parish
Walker Memorial Hall, Bridgton, Maine, listed on the NRHP in Cumberland County
Walker Memorial Library, Westbrook, Maine, listed on the NRHP in Cumberland County
Walker-Collis House, Belchertown, Massachusetts, listed on the NRHP in Hampshire County
Harding House-Walker Missionary Home, Newton, Massachusetts, listed on the NRHP in Middlesex County 
Walker Home for Missionary Children, Newton, Massachusetts, listed on the NRHP in Middlesex County
Bogle-Walker House, Sudbury, Massachusetts, listed on the NRHP in Middlesex County
Peter Walker House, Taunton, Massachusetts, listed on the NRHP in Bristol County
Walker Tavern, Cambridge Junction, Michigan, listed on the NRHP in Lenawee County
Franklin H. Walker House, Detroit, Michigan, listed on the NRHP
Miller-Walker House, Saline, Michigan, listed on the NRHP in Washtenaw County
Walker and Valentine House, Rushford, Minnesota, listed on the NRHP in Fillmore County
Walker-Critz House, Starkville, Mississippi, listed on the NRHP in Oktibbeha County
Walker-Woodward-Schaffer House, Palmyra, Missouri, listed on the NRHP in Marion County
Walker House (Kalispell, Montana), listed on the NRHP in Flathead County
Upham-Walker House, Concord, New Hampshire, listed on the NRHP in Merrimack County
Walker-Combs-Hartshorne Farmstead, Freehold, New Jersey, listed on the NRHP in Monmouth County
Walker House (Garrison, New York), listed on the National Register of Historic Places in Putnam County, New York
Gifford-Walker Farm, North Bergen, New York, listed on the NRHP in Genesee County
Walker Cottage, Saranac Lake (Harrietstown), New York, listed on the NRHP in Franklin County
Walker's Inn, Andrews, North Carolina, listed on the NRHP in Cherokee County
Holloway-Walker Dollarhite House, Bethel Hill, North Carolina, listed on the NRHP in Person County
T. J. Walker Historic District, Fort Ransom, North Dakota, listed on the NRHP in Ransom County
Christopher C. Walker House and Farm, New Madison, Ohio, listed on the NRHP in Darke County
William Walker, Jr., House, Upper Sandusky, Ohio, listed on the NRHP in Wyandot County
Walker House (Shawnee, Oklahoma), listed on the National Register of Historic Places in Pottawatomie County
John P. Walker House, Ashland, Oregon, listed on the NRHP in Jackson County
Walker-Ewing Log House, Oakdale, Pennsylvania, listed on the NRHP in Allegheny County
Joseph Walker House, Tredyffrin Township, Pennsylvania, listed on the NRHP in eastern Chester County
Phillip Walker House, East Providence, Rhode Island, listed on the NRHP in Providence County
Colding-Walker House, Appleton, South Carolina, listed on the NRHP in Allendale County
Albion Walker Chalkrock House, Tabor, South Dakota, listed on the NRHP in Bon Homme County
James Buchanan Walker House, Centerville, Tennessee, listed on the NRHP in Hickman County 
Walker Sisters Place, a.k.a. King-Walker Place, Gatlinburg, Tennessee, listed on the NRHP in Sevier County, Tennessee
 Thomas J. Walker House, Knoxville, Tennessee
Oliphant-Walker House, Austin, Texas, listed on the NRHP in Travis County
James Walker Log House, Brenham, Texas, listed on the NRHP in Washington County
J. A. Walker House and R. B. Rogers House, Brownwood, Texas, listed on the NRHP in Brown County
Howard Walker House, Lufkin, Texas, listed on the NRHP in Angelina County
Walker Ranch (San Antonio, Texas), San Antonio, Texas, listed on the NRHP in Bexar County 
Walker House (Shoreacres, Texas), listed on the NRHP in Harris County 
Samuel D. Walker House, Park City, Utah, listed on the NRHP in Summit County
Maggie Lena Walker House, National Historic Site, Richmond, Virginia, listed on the NRHP 
Scott-Walker House, Saltville, Virginia, listed on the NRHP in Smyth County
Walker House (Warren, Virginia), listed on the NRHP in Albemarle County
Harry B. Walker House, Milwaukee, Wisconsin, listed on the NRHP in Milwaukee County
 Walker House (Mineral Point, Wisconsin), an inn and restaurant
Kneeland-Walker House, Wauwatosa, Wisconsin, listed on the NRHP in Milwaukee County

See also
Walker Hall (disambiguation) 
Walker Building (disambiguation)
Walker (disambiguation)